Louis Bazin (20 December 1920 – 2 March 2011) was a French orientalist.

Biography
Born in Caen, he entered the École Normale Supérieure in 1939. When he graduated in 1943, he became a senior research fellow at the French National Centre for Scientific Research, while continuing his studies at the National School for Modern Oriental Languages.

In 1949, he became a professor-delegate after his teacher Jean Deny retired. In 1957, he became a full professor at the ENLOV (the above-mentioned Oriental Language School's new name). Since 1950, he has also been the director of studies at the École pratique des hautes études (Section IV). Beginning in 1980, Bazin became a Professor at the University of Paris III. He retired from his position there in 1990.

Bazin was a member of the Asiatic Society (of which he was formerly vice-chairman). He was also a member of the International Union of Oriental and Asian Studies (of which he was formerly the treasurer, secretary general and vice-president), and the Academy of Inscriptions and Belles-Lettres (elected 22 October 1993 to the chair Claude Cahen). He was Vice-Chairman of the Societas Uralo-Altaica, and was president of the section of Oriental Languages and Cultures of the French National Centre for Scientific Research.

Bibliography

 1950: Recherches sur les parlers t’o-pa - T’oung Pao (通報)
 1953: La déesse-mère chez les Turcs pré-islamiques - Bulletin de la Société Ernest Renan
 1959: Structures et tendances communes des langues turques - in Philologiae Turcicae Fundamenta
 1959: Le Turkmène, description grammaticale - ibid.
 1961: Y a-t-il en turc des alternances vocaliques ? - Ural-Altaische Jahrbücher
 1964: La littérature épigraphique turque ancienne - Philologiae Turcicae Fundamenta
 1964: Über die Sternkunde in alttürkischer Zeit - Abhandlungen der Mainzer Akademie
 1965: Aventures merveilleuses sous terre et ailleurs de Er-Töshtük le géant des steppes, traduction du Kirghiz de Pertev Boratav, introduction et notes de Pertev Boratav et Louis Bazin, Gallimard, « Connaissance de l'Orient »
 1967: Mirza Fathali Akhoundov : Comédies (traduction annotée)
 1968, 1987: (3e ed.) Introduction à l’étude de la langue turque - Librairie d'Amérique et d'Orient - Jean Maisonneuve, succ.
 1972: Un manuscrit chinois et turc runiforme de Touen-houang - Turcica
 1973: Cinquante ans d’orientalisme en France. « les études turques » - Journal asiatique
 1974: Les calendriers turcs anciens et médiévaux - thèse de doctorat
 1975: Makhtoumkouli Firaqui : Poèmes de Turkménie - traduction annotée, en collaboration avec Pertev Borarav
 1976: Eine Inschrift vom Obern Jenissei - Materialia turcica
 1985: La réforme des langues don't «La réforme linguistique en Turquie» (Hambourg, 1985)
 1989: L’épigraphie turque ancienne de Haute-Asie (VIIIe-XIe s.) : Résultats et perspectives - CRAI
 1989: Er-Töshtük (with Pertev Boratav)
 1990: Où en est le comparatisme turco-mongol ? - Mémoires de la Société de Linguistique de Paris
 1991: Les systèmes chronologiques dans le monde turc ancien. -  Bibliotheca orientalis hungarica
 1991: Manichéisme et syncrétisme chez les Ouïgours - Turcica
 1994: Les Turcs, des mots, des hommes, choix d’articles de Louis Bazin - recueil d’articles édité par Michèle Nicolas et Gilles Veinstein
 1994: État des discussions sur la pénétration du bouddhisme en milieu turc - Res Orientales. Hommages à Claude Cahen
 1995: Les noms de Dieu et du Prophète dans les premiers textes de la littérature turque islamique (XIe s.) - Mélanges Philippe Gignoux
 1995: Un nom turco-mongol du « nombril » et du « clan » - Beläk Bitig. Festschrift G. Doerfer
 1995: Qui était Alp Er Tonga, identifié par les Turcs à Afrâsyâb ? - Pand-o-Sokhan. Mélanges offerts à Charles-Henri de Fouchécour
 1996: Survivances préislamiques dans l’épigraphie funéraire des Turcs musulmans - İslam Dünyasında Mezarlıklar ve Defin Gelenekleri
 1998: Le livre de Dede Korkut, Récit de la Geste oghuz - with Altan Gökalp - L’aube des peuples

References

External links 
 Site de l'Académie des Inscriptions et Belles-Lettres, page de Louis Bazin
 Interview of French Turcologist Louis Bazin in 1994
 Bazin's site at the Académie française 

French orientalists
Turkologists
1920 births
2011 deaths
Members of the Académie des Inscriptions et Belles-Lettres
Members of the Société Asiatique
École Normale Supérieure alumni
Academic staff of Sorbonne Nouvelle University Paris 3
Officiers of the Légion d'honneur
Commandeurs of the Ordre des Palmes Académiques
Writers from Caen